Palaquium ottolanderi is a tree in the family Sapotaceae.

Description
The twigs are brownish tomentose. Inflorescences bear up to 16 flowers.

Distribution and habitat
Palaquium ottolanderi is native to Thailand, Peninsular Malaysia, Sumatra, Java and Borneo. Its habitat is lowland mixed dipterocarp forests.

Conservation
Palaquium ottolanderi has been assessed as near threatened on the IUCN Red List. The species is threatened by logging and land conversion for palm oil plantations.

References

ottolanderi
Trees of Thailand
Trees of Malesia
Plants described in 1894